Hetény may refer to:

 Hungarian name of Chotín, now Slovakia
 Hungarian name of Hetin, now in Serbia
 Hosszúhetény (means "long Hetény")

See also
 Hetényi